The Pyrkakay mine was a large open pit mine located in the Shelag Range, Chukotka Mountains, Chukotka Autonomous Okrug, North-eastern Russia. 

Pyrkakay represented one of the largest tin reserves in Russia having estimated reserves of 228.5 million tonnes of ore grading 0.23% tin.

The Krasnoarmeysky settlement, built to house the miners, was determined to no longer be economically viable in 1998 and is now a ghost town.

See also 
 List of mines in Russia

References 

Tin mines in Russia
Economy of Chukotka Autonomous Okrug
Chukotka Mountains
Mines in the Soviet Union
ru:Пыркакайские штокверки